The PSA World Series 2016–17 is a series of men's and women's squash tournaments which are part of the Professional Squash Association (PSA) World Tour for the end of the 2016 and the start of the 2017 squash season. The PSA World Series tournaments are some of the most prestigious events on the men's and women's tour. The best-performing players in the World Series events qualify for the annual 2017 Men's PSA World Series Finals and 2017 Women's PSA World Series Finals tournament.

PSA World Series Ranking Points
PSA World Series events also have a separate World Series ranking.  Points for this are calculated on a cumulative basis after each World Series event. The top eight players at the end of the calendar year are then eligible to play in the PSA World Series Finals.

Men's

Tournaments

Standings

Bold – Players qualified for the final

(*) - did not qualify to finals due to have not played enough World Series tournaments.

Women's

Tournaments

Standings

Bold – Players qualified for the final

(*) - Did not play Finals due to an injury.

See also
2016 PSA World Tour
2017 PSA World Tour
Official Men's Squash World Ranking
Official Women's Squash World Ranking

References

External links 
 World Series Series Squash website

PSA World Tour seasons
2016 in squash
2017 in squash